Robitaille is a surname. Notable people with the surname include:

JF Robitaille, Canadian singer-songwriter 
John Robitaille (born 1948), American politician and businessman in Rhode Island
Luc Robitaille (born 1966), Canadian ice hockey player, left wing for numerous teams, mainly for the Los Angeles Kings
Luke Robitaille, (born 2003), American mathematician and IMO gold medalist
Mike Robitaille (born 1948), Canadian ice hockey player, defenceman for, among other teams, the Buffalo Sabres, for which he currently serves as commentator
Pat Robitaille (born 1986), Canadian folk rock musician
Randy Robitaille (born 1975), Canadian ice hockey player, centreman for numerous teams, formerly with the Ottawa Senators, currently playing in the KHL
Tom Robitaille, American basketball player
Fictional characters
Daniel Robitaille, also known as [the] Candyman, a fictional character originally written by Clive Barker